In mathematics, the Jordan–Chevalley decomposition, named after Camille Jordan and Claude Chevalley, expresses a linear operator as the sum of its commuting semisimple part and its nilpotent part. The multiplicative decomposition expresses an invertible operator as the product of its commuting semisimple and unipotent parts. The decomposition is easy to describe when the Jordan normal form of the operator is given, but it exists under weaker hypotheses than the existence of a Jordan normal form. Analogues of the Jordan-Chevalley decomposition exist for elements of linear algebraic groups, Lie algebras, and Lie groups, and the decomposition is an important tool in the study of these objects.

Decomposition of a linear operator 
Consider linear operators on a finite-dimensional vector space over a field. An operator T is semisimple if every T-invariant subspace has a complementary T-invariant subspace (if the underlying field is algebraically closed, this is the same as the requirement that the operator be diagonalizable). An operator x is nilpotent if some power xm of it is the zero operator. An operator x is unipotent if x − 1 is nilpotent.

Now, let x be any operator. A Jordan–Chevalley decomposition of x is an expression of it as a sum
x = xs + xn,

where xs is semisimple, xn is nilpotent, and xs and xn commute. Over a perfect field, such a decomposition exists (cf. #Proof of uniqueness and existence), the decomposition is unique, and the xs and xn are polynomials in x with no constant terms. In particular, for any such decomposition over a perfect field, an operator that commutes with x also commutes with xs and xn.

If x is an invertible operator, then a multiplicative Jordan–Chevalley decomposition expresses x as a product
x = xs · xu,

where xs is semisimple, xu is unipotent, and xs and xu  commute. Again, over a perfect field, such a decomposition exists, the decomposition is unique, and xs and xu are polynomials in x.

(Conversely, by the same type of argument, one can deduce the additive version from the multiplicative one.)

If x is written in Jordan normal form (with respect to some basis) then xs is the endomorphism whose matrix contains just the diagonal terms of x, and xn is the endomorphism whose matrix contains just the off-diagonal terms; xu is the endomorphism whose matrix is obtained from the Jordan normal form by dividing all entries of each Jordan block by its diagonal element.

Proof of uniqueness and existence 
The sum of commuting nilpotent endomorphisms is nilpotent, and over a perfect field the sum of commuting semisimple endomorphisms is again semisimple.

We show the existence. Let V be a finite-dimensional vector space over a perfect field k and  an endomorphism.

First assume the base field k is algebraically closed. Note that, in terms of a basis respecting the direct sum decomposition,  is a diagonal matrix; hence, it is a semisimple endomorphism. Since  is then  whose -th power is zero, we also have that  is nilpotent, establishing the existence of the decomposition.

But this is not needed here.)

The fact that  are polynomials in x follows from the Chinese remainder theorem. Indeed, 
let  be the characteristic polynomial of x. Now, the Chinese remainder theorem applied to the polynomial ring  gives a polynomial  satisfying the conditions
 (for all i).

The condition , when spelled out, means that  for some polynomial . The condition  ensures that  and  have no constant terms. This completes the proof of the algebraically closed field case.

If k is an arbitrary perfect field, let  be the absolute Galois group of k. By the first part, we can choose polynomials  over  such that  is the decomposition into the semisimple and nilpotent part.

Thus,  and  commute. Also, the application of  evidently preserves semisimplicity and nilpotency. Hence,  are -invariant; i.e., they are endomorphisms (represented by matrices) over k. Finally, since  contains a -basis that spans the space containing , by the same argument, we also see that  have coefficients in k. This completes the proof. Q.E.D.

Short proof using abstract algebra 
 proves the existence of a decomposition as a consequence of the Wedderburn principal theorem. (This approach is not only short but also makes the role of the assumption that the base field be perfect clearer.)

Let V be a finite-dimensional vector space over a perfect field k,  an endomorphism and  the subalgebra generated by x. Note that A is a commutative Artinian ring. The Wedderburn principal theorem states: for a finite-dimensional algebra A with the Jacobson radical J, if  is separable, then the natural surjection  splits; i.e.,  contains a semisimple subalgebra  such that  is an isomorphism. In the setup here,  is separable since the base field is perfect (so the theorem is applicable) and J is also the nilradical of A. There is then the vector-space decomposition . Now, the image of x generates ; thus  is semisimple and is a polynomial of x. Also,  is nilpotent since  is nilpotent and is a polynomial of x since  is.

Nilpotency criterion 
The Jordan decomposition can be used to characterize nilpotency of an endomorphism. Let k be an algebraically closed field of characteristic zero,  the endomorphism ring of k over rational numbers and V a finite-dimensional vector space over k. Given an endomorphism , let  be the Jordan decomposition. Then  is diagonalizable; i.e.,  where each  is the eigenspace for eigenvalue  with multiplicity . (For example, if , then the complex conjugate of an endomorphism is an example of a replica.) Now,

Proof: First, since  is nilpotent,
.

If  is the complex conjugation, this implies  for every i. Applying that to the above equation, one gets:

and, since  are all real numbers,  for every i. Varying the linear functionals then implies  for every i. 

A typical application of the above criterion is the proof of Cartan's criterion for solvability of a Lie algebra. It says: if  is a Lie subalgebra over a field k of characteristic zero such that  for each , then  is solvable.

Proof: Without loss of generality, assume k is algebraically closed. By Lie's theorem and Engel's theorem, it suffices to show for each ,  is a nilpotent endomorphism of V. Write . Then we need to show:

is zero. Let . That is, which implies the claim given the assumption.

Counterexample to existence over an imperfect field 
If the ground field is not perfect, then a Jordan–Chevalley decomposition may not exist. Example: Let p be a prime number, let  be imperfect of characteristic , and choose  in  that is not a th power. This has as its invariant -linear subspaces precisely the ideals of  viewed as a ring, which correspond to the ideals of  containing . Hence, therefore  for some polynomial . Also,  we see that . Since  is of characteristic , we have . Since , we have . Combining these results we get .

Analogous decompositions 
The multiplicative version of the Jordan-Chevalley decomposition generalizes to a decomposition in a linear algebraic group, and the additive version of the decomposition generalizes to a decomposition in a Lie algebra.

Lie algebras 
Let  denote the Lie algebra of the endomorphisms of a finite-dimensional vector space V over a perfect field. Indeed, first,  and  commute since . Second, in general, for each endomorphism , we have:
 If , then , since  is the difference of the left and right multiplications by y.
 If  is semisimple, then  is semisimple.

Real semisimple Lie algebras 
In the formulation of Chevalley and Mostow, the additive decomposition states that an element X in a real semisimple Lie algebra g with Iwasawa decomposition g = k ⊕ a ⊕ n   can be written as the sum of three commuting elements of the Lie algebra X = S + D + N, with S, D and N conjugate to elements in k, a and n respectively. In general the terms in the Iwasawa decomposition do not commute.

Linear algebraic groups 
Let  be a linear algebraic group over a perfect field. Then, essentially by definition, there is a closed embedding . Now, to each element , by the multiplicative Jordan decomposition, there are a pair of a semisimple element  and a unipotent element  a priori in  such that .

When G is abelian,  is then the direct product of the closed subgroup of the semisimple elements in G and that of unipotent elements.

Real semisimple Lie groups 
The multiplicative decomposition states that if g is an element of the corresponding connected semisimple Lie group G with corresponding Iwasawa decomposition G = KAN, then g can be written as the product of three commuting elements g = sdu with s, d and u conjugate to elements of K, A and N respectively. In general the terms in the Iwasawa decomposition g = kan do not commute.

References 

 
 

 
 
 

 
 

Linear algebra
Lie algebras
Algebraic groups
Matrix decompositions